Pacific Title & Art Studio was an American company founded in Hollywood in 1919 by Leon Schlesinger. At first, it primarily produced title cards for silent films. As talking pictures ("talkies") gained popularity in 1929 and 1930, Schlesinger looked for ways to capitalize on the new technology and stay in business, and as a result, the firm moved into general film editing and post-production work.

The company was sold in 2007 for US$23 million, after which it "ran into hard times." The 90-year-old company went into receivership and was expected to be liquidated.

In December 2012, former CEO Phil Feinerwho had been operating PJF Productions in Burbank, California, as a privately owned business since 2008acquired the "Pacific Title" name after learning that it had become available. PJF now does business using the "Pacific Title" name and its classic logo.

References

External links
 Extra credits: The history and collection of Pacific Title and Art Studio by Harris, Adam Duncan
 Fired exec at Hollywood firm files suit
 The Academy honors the industryÕs top technical innovators at the annual Sci-Tech Awards ceremony.
 Digital proves problematic
 Pacific Title nabbed
 Film restoration more than 'Rear Window'-dressing
 Pacific Title gets new owners
 Pac Title's Phil Feiner: Tax the Studios on Incentives
 First Person: Restoring Film with Digital Recombination
 Inside the Holocron Ð Hidden Heroes Ð Polland, Burtt & Feiner
 New Colors Bring "Wizard of Oz" Back To Life

Design companies established in 1919
Mass media companies established in 1919
1919 establishments in California
Film production companies of the United States
Film and television title designers